Biliński may refer to:
 Biliński coat of arms, a Polish Coat of Arms
 Leon Biliński (1846–1923), a Minister of Finance of the Republic of Poland, president of the Supreme National Committee and Galician ruler
 Marek Biliński (born 1953), a Polish composer
 Mieczysław Biliński (born 1928), a politician, member of Polish Law and Justice Party
 Roman Bilinski (born 2004), Polish-British racing driver
 Stanko Bilinski (1909–1998), Croatian mathematician and academician
 Sylwester Biliński, the drummer of Polish punk band The Analogs
 Tadeusz Biliński (1892–1960), a member of former Polish United Workers' Party
 Vanda Bilinski (born 1944), Swiss chess master